Großer Wünsdorfer See is a lake in Brandenburg, Germany. At an elevation of 39 m, its surface area is 180 ha. It is located at Wünsdorf, an Ortsteil of the town of Zossen.

External links

Lakes of Brandenburg
Teltow-Fläming
LGrosserWunsdorferSee